Pseudotryonia is a genus of gastropods belonging to the family Cochliopidae.

The species of this genus are found in Northern America.

Species:

Pseudotryonia adamantina 
Pseudotryonia alamosae 
Pseudotryonia brevissima 
Pseudotryonia grahamae 
Pseudotryonia mica 
Pseudotryonia pasajae

References

Gastropods